A credit analyst 

is a person employed by an organization to analyze the credit worthiness of customers and potential customers, 
and to assist in the ongoing management and modeling of credit risk thereafter. 
In May 2015, the U.S. Bureau of Labor Statistics reported 70,840 people employed as credit analysts. The salary for this position ranged from $40,250 to $134,080 with a mean average wage of $79,720.

In investment banks, "quants" are responsible for the analytics related to the risk management and regulatory capital due to credit risk on the banking book (and to pricing and hedging credit derivatives). This position is distinct from the more commercially-focused credit management role described in this article.

Job responsibilities
Job responsibilities include the following:
 Reviewing credit applications
 Projecting sales
 Evaluating credit risk
 Analyzing financial data, statements and trends
 Setting new customer credit limits
 Recommending credit limits based on company credit policies
 Performing credit reviews of existing customers
 Maintaining customer files with financial statements and bank reference information
 Resolving credit issues
 Monitoring risk trends on behalf of management and sales personnel

Education 

Credit analysts typically 

hold a business related bachelor's degree majoring in finance, in accounting, in business administration, or in economics. 
Depending on the role, some companies may require a professional certification such as the  Credit Business Associate from the National Association of Credit Management (NACM).

Particularly for analysis involving the technical elements of EAD, PD and LGD modelling, some quantitative training, specifically in statistics and calculus, will be required.
Often, a math or actuarial degree, and / or the FRM or PRM certification may be recommended. See also .

Professional Organizations 
Credit analysts in the United States can obtain memberships, continuing education and certification through NACM. Certification levels include Credit Business Associate, Certified Credit and Risk Analyst, Credit Business Fellow, Certified Credit Executive, Certified International Credit Professional and International Certified Credit Executive.

See also 
 Credit assistant
 Credit manager
 Director of credit and collections
 Financial analyst

References 

Credit management
Finance occupations
Financial analysts